This article contains lists of achievements in major senior-level international ice hockey and Para ice hockey tournaments according to first-place, second-place and third-place results obtained by teams representing different nations. The objective is not to create combined medal tables; the focus is on listing the best positions achieved by teams in major international tournaments, ranking the nations according to the most number of podiums accomplished by teams of these nations.

Results 
For the making of these lists, results from following major international tournaments were consulted:

 IIHF: International Ice Hockey Federation
 IOC: International Olympic Committee
 IPC: International Paralympic Committee

Medals earned by athletes from defunct National Olympic Committees (NOCs) and National Paralympic Committees (NPCs) or historical teams are NOT merged with the results achieved by their immediate successor states. The International Olympic Committee (IOC) and International Paralympic Committee (IPC) do NOT combine medals of these nations or teams.

The tables are pre-sorted by total number of first-place results, second-place results and third-place results, respectively. When equal ranks are given, nations are listed in alphabetical order.

Ice hockey and Para ice hockey 

*Defunct National Olympic Committees (NOCs) and National Paralympic Committees (NPCs) or historical teams are shown in italic.

Ice hockey

Men and women 

*Defunct National Olympic Committees (NOCs) or historical teams are shown in italic.

Men 

*Defunct National Olympic Committees (NOCs) or historical teams are shown in italic.

Women

Para ice hockey

See also 
 IIHF World Ranking
 Major achievements in Olympic team ball sports by nation
 List of major achievements in sports by nation

Notes

References

General 
Official results
 Ice hockey
 Olympic tournament and World Championship: Past Tournaments
 Para ice hockey
 Paralympics tournament and World Championship: Results

Specific

External links 
 International Ice Hockey Federation (IIHF) – official website
 International Paralympic Committee (IPC) – official website

Ice hockey
Achievements
Achievements